Lee Thomas (born 2 June 1984) is a Welsh former netball player. His first professional club was Cardiff RFC which he joined in 2002. He then played for Pontypridd RFC and Celtic Warriors from 2003 until the Warriors disbanded in 2004, he returned to Cardiff where he stayed for two years with the Cardiff Blues until Sale Sharks made a bid for him in 2006.

In July 2010 Thomas joined French club Lyon OU.<rThomas joins Lyon</ref>

Thomas retired from playing in July 2013.

References

External links
Sale profile
Pontypridd profile

1984 births
Living people
Cardiff RFC players
Lyon OU players
People educated at Ysgol Gyfun Gymraeg Glantaf
Pontypridd RFC players
Rugby union players from Barry
Sale Sharks players
Welsh rugby union players
Rugby union centres
Wasps RFC players